In the law of England and Wales and some other common law jurisdictions, binding over is an exercise of certain powers by the criminal courts used to deal with low-level public order issues. Both magistrates' courts and the Crown Court may issue binding-over orders in certain circumstances.

In the United Kingdom
In a 1988 article in the Cambridge Law Journal, British legal commentator David Feldman describes the power to "bind people over to be of good behaviour or to keep the peace" as a useful and common device used in the British criminal justice system, and explains the process as follows: 

The origins of the binding-over power are rooted in (1) the takings of sureties of the peace, which "emerged from the peace-keeping arrangements of Anglo-Saxon law, extended by the use of the royal prerogative and royal writs" and (2) the separate device of sureties of good behavior, which originated as a type of conditional pardon given by the king. The modern statutory authorization for binding-over powers is found in the Justices of the Peace Act 1361 and Justices of the Peace Act 1968. Section 150 of the Powers of Criminal Courts (Sentencing) Act 2000 empowered the criminal courts to "bind over a parent/guardian of a convicted youth to take proper care and exercise proper control" over the youth.

Outside the UK
Binding-over orders are a feature of the law of Hong Kong.

See also
Justices of the Peace Act 1361
Peace bond
Probation
Anti-social behaviour order

References

English legal terminology